Daniel John Sullivan III (born March 9, 1950), better known as Danny Sullivan, is an American former racing driver. He earned 17 wins in the CART Indy Car World Series, including the 1985 Indianapolis 500. Sullivan won the 1988 CART Championship, and placed third in points in 1986. Sullivan also scored a victory in IROC. He competed in the 1983 Formula One season with Tyrrell, scoring 2 championship points.

Before racing
Sullivan was born in Louisville, Kentucky to a building contractor father. He attended the Kentucky Military Institute and then the Jim Russell Racing School. He had several odd jobs before his racing career, including lumberjack, and most famously, New York City cab driver.

Formula One
Sullivan was given a 21st birthday present of a course at the Jim Russell Racing Drivers School at the Snetterton circuit in England. He competed in Formula Ford, Formula Three and Formula Two before returning to race in the United States.

In 1980–81, he drove for Garvin Brown Racing in the SCCA Can-Am Series, scoring one victory in 1981 at the season-ending Caesars Palace Grand Prix.

In 1982, he made his début in the PPG Indycar series, and was recruited by the Tyrrell Formula One team for the  season at the request of primary sponsor Benetton, who wanted an American driver. Sullivan competed in the fifteen races of the 1983 season, scoring two points with a fifth place at the Monaco Grand Prix and finishing seventeenth in the World Drivers' Championship. He also performed strongly in the non-championship Race of Champions held at the Brands Hatch circuit in April, seeing off an early race challenge from  World Champion Alan Jones, before finishing second behind reigning World Champion Keke Rosberg, finishing only half-a-second behind the Williams after 40 laps of racing.

Nevertheless, he was somewhat overshadowed by his more experienced teammate, Michele Alboreto (who won the 1983 Detroit Grand Prix for the team, its last F1 victory), and was not retained at the end of the season.

CART career

For 1984, Sullivan returned to North America, where he competed in the CART PPG Indy Car series. He first landed at Shierson Racing, winning three races including the Pocono 500, and placing 4th in points. In 1985, he moved to Penske Racing, winning the 1985 Indianapolis 500. His victory at Indy, known in auto racing lore as the "spin and win" is one of the most legendary moments in Indy 500 history.

Sullivan would set the pace at Indy again in 1988, qualifying second and leading 91 of the first 101 laps. Sullivan was part of the all-Penske front row with teammates Rick Mears and Al Unser Sr. A wing adjuster broke on Sullivan's car just after the halfway mark, and his car hit the outside wall in turn one, ending his day. Nevertheless, he rebounded, posting finishes of 4th or better over the next six races, winning at Portland and the Michigan 500. The win at Michigan completed a career Indy car Triple Crown (Indianapolis, Michigan, Pocono). He finished the season with five top-5 finishes over the final five races, including two wins. At the second-to-last race of the season at Laguna Seca, Sullivan won the pole position, led the most laps, and won the race. With still one race remaining, Sullivan clinched the 1988 CART championship, holding an insurmountable 35-point lead. It was Sullivan's first championship title and Penske's first since 1985.

In 1989, Sullivan suffered a broken arm in a crash during practice for the Indy 500, and would miss two races. He rebounded to win the Pocono 500 in August - his second win in that event - and one other race to place a respectable 7th in points. Sullivan's last season with Penske Racing was 1990. He won two races in 1990, including the season finale at Laguna Seca. He won the pole and led wire-to-wire in his final start for Roger Penske.

In 1991, Sullivan switched to the Patrick Racing Alfa Romeo team. After going winless in 1991 in a very uncompetitive machine, he parted ways with Patrick. Sullivan won two more CART races between 1992 and 1993, driving for Galles-Kraco Racing. He scored the first win for the Galmer chassis at Long Beach. It came after he bumped teammate and race leader Al Unser Jr. on the backstretch with less than four laps to go. The incident sparked friction within the team. His later years were plagued with inconsistency, leading to a semi-retirement in 1994. His brief tenure at Galles was described as particularly toxic.

In 1986, Sullivan was a guest star on the television show Miami Vice ("Florence Italy") playing a race car driver accused of murdering a prostitute. The episode featured some short outdoor scenes in the pit lanes of the Miami Grand Prix. Sullivan had limited dialogue in the episode; his longest piece of dialogue was in a police station interrogation scene.

Also in 1991, the Leland Corporation released the arcade game Danny Sullivan's Indy Heat, featuring his likeness.

After Indy

In 1994, Sullivan took a sabbatical from Indy car racing. After being released from Galles Racing very late after the 1993 season, Sullivan was unable to find a new ride as most seats at that point had already been filled. He joined ABC/ESPN as a color commentator. He also attempted to run selected events in the NASCAR Winston Cup Series that season. However, he failed to qualify for several events; he qualified for only one race (the 1994 Brickyard 400), and finished 33rd for a very underfunded team. In 1994, he had some guest starts for Alfa Romeo in the DTM and together with Thierry Boutsen and Hans-Joachim Stuck he was third overall with the Dauer 962 LM at the 24 Hours of Le Mans.

He returned to CART racing for one final year in 1995. His season ended early after a serious crash at Michigan International Speedway. While recovering from a broken pelvis and other injuries, he announced his retirement from open-wheel competition. He returned to ABC-TV for 1996–1998.

Sullivan was a paid celebrity endorser for Danny Sullivan Lexus in Jacksonville, Florida. The Lexus Dealership was owned primarily by members of the Davis family, who were the founders of Winn Dixie supermarkets.

Sullivan was also instrumental in the Red Bull Driver Search program to find an American driver to compete in Formula One.

He was the drivers' representative on the stewards' panel for the 2010 German Grand Prix, 2010 Singapore Grand Prix, 2012 Hungarian Grand Prix, 2013 Australian Grand Prix, 2014 Spanish Grand Prix, 2017 Azerbaijan Grand Prix, 2018 Bahrain Grand Prix, 2018 Chinese Grand Prix, and 2018 Monaco Grand Prix.

Sullivan and Michael Andretti were inducted into the Motorsports Walk of Fame on April 5, 2010, along the route of the Toyota Grand Prix of Long Beach, which both men have won.

Sullivan serves as a senior advisor at Tempus Jets and its parent company, Orion Air Group, LLC. He also has various business relationships with Lexus, ABC/ESPN, CBS, Red Bull, Acura, and Toyota.

Awards
Sullivan was inducted into the Motorsports Hall of Fame of America in 2012, and the Indianapolis Motor Speedway Hall of Fame in 2022.

Racing career results

Indianapolis 500 results

Complete Formula One World Championship results
(key)

Non-Championship Formula One results
(key) (Races in bold indicate pole position)
(Races in italics indicate fastest lap)

CART career results

NASCAR
(key) (Bold – Pole position awarded by qualifying time. Italics – Pole position earned by points standings or practice time. * – Most laps led.)

Winston Cup Series

24 Hours of Le Mans results

See also
 List of people from the Louisville metropolitan area

References

External links

Grand Prix encyclopedia entry on Danny Sullivan
Sullivan's 1985 win on Indy500.com 
The Greatest 33
Sullivan spins 360 degrees and goes on to win the Indy 500

1950 births
Living people
American Formula One drivers
Champ Car champions
Champ Car drivers
Indianapolis 500 drivers
Indianapolis 500 winners
European Formula Two Championship drivers
Atlantic Championship drivers
International Race of Champions drivers
Motorsport announcers
Racing drivers from Louisville, Kentucky
Sportspeople from Louisville, Kentucky
24 Hours of Le Mans drivers
24 Hours of Daytona drivers
American Le Mans Series drivers
European Le Mans Series drivers
Tyrrell Formula One drivers
World Sportscar Championship drivers
NASCAR drivers
ARCA Menards Series drivers
Team Penske drivers
Porsche Motorsports drivers
PacWest Racing drivers
Jaguar Racing drivers
Forsythe Racing drivers
Team Joest drivers
USAC Gold Crown champions